Kush-Imyan (Quşimän) is a rural locality (a village) in Mesyagutovsky Selsoviet, Yanaulsky District, Bashkortostan, Russia. The population was 3 as of 2010. There is 1 street.

Geography 
Kush-Imyan is located 50 km southeast of Yanaul (the district's administrative centre) by road. Teplyaki is the nearest rural locality.

References 

Rural localities in Yanaulsky District